Mingxing Film Company, also known as the Star Motion Picture Company, was one of the largest production companies during the 1920s, and 1930s in the Republican era. Founded in Shanghai, the company lasted from 1922 until 1937 when it was closed permanently by the Second Sino-Japanese War.

History
Founded in 1922 by Zhang Shichuan, Zheng Zhengqiu, and Zhou Jianyun, Mingxing emerged along with Dazhonghua Baihe Film Company, and Tianyi Film Company as one of the three dominant film studios of the 1920s. During this period, all three studios were known for producing "light" entertainment though even at this early time there was a sign of social criticism, inherited from the May 4th Movement.

The film company struggled in its first few years with comic shorts like 1922's Laborer's Love. In 1923, the company produced Orphan Rescues Grandfather which became a commercial success and with it Mingxing's fortunes were assured.
By the early 1930s, Mingxing had become the leading film studio in China, and dominated the market with its upstart rival, the Lianhua Film Company (which had co-opted Dazhonghua Baihe) as a close second. In 1931, the first Chinese sound film Sing-Song Girl Red Peony was made, the product of a cooperation between the Mingxing Film Company's image production and Pathé's sound technology. However, the sound was disc-recorded, and the first sound-on-film talkie made in China was by Tianyi Film Company.  Tianyi also continued to produce films throughout the 1930s, though its output did not match the two leaders. By the mid-1930s, both Mingxing and Lianhua became major production houses for films in Shanghai. With the death of co-founder Zheng Zhengqiu in 1934, and the advent of full-scale war in 1937, Mingxing was forced to close its doors permanently.

Elements of the Mingxing operation would be resurrected by Zhang Shichuan in 1938 as the Guohao Film Company.

Notable films
Laborer's Love (1922) (Dir. Zhang Shichuan)
The Burning of the Red Lotus Temple (1928) (Dir Zhang Shichuan)
Spring Silkworms (1933) (Dir. Cheng Bugao)
Wild Torrents (1933) (Dir. Cheng Bugao)
The Boatman's Daughter (1935) (Dir. Shen Xiling)
Crossroads (1937) (Dir. Shen Xiling)
Street Angel (1937) (Dir. Yuan Muzhi)

See also
Cinema of China
List of Chinese production companies (pre-PRC)

Notes

References 
 Fu, Poshek. Between Shanghai and Hong Kong: The Politics of Chinese Cinemas. Stanford:  Stanford University Press, 2003.
 Zhang, Yingjin. "A Centennial Review of Chinese Cinema" available at https://web.archive.org/web/20080907160026/http://chinesecinema.ucsd.edu/essay_ccwlc.html.

External links
An Incomplete List of Films Produced by Mingxing

Chinese film studios
Film production companies of China
Defunct film and television production companies of China
Mass media companies established in 1922
Mass media in Shanghai
Mass media companies disestablished in 1937
Companies based in Shanghai
Chinese companies established in 1922
1937 disestablishments in China